Ganjnameh is located 12 km southwest of Hamadan (ancient Ecbatana) in western Iran, at an altitude of  meters across Mount Alvand. The site is home to two trilingual Achaemenid cuneiform inscriptions. The inscription on the upper left was created on the order of Achaemenid King Darius the Great (522–486 BC) and the one on the right by his son King Xerxes the Great (486–465 BC).

Description
The two inscription panels of Ganjnameh, carved in stone in 20 lines on a granite rock above a creek, measure 2 × 3 m each. Written in Old Persian, Neo-Babylonian and Neo-Elamite, except for the different royal name, the contents of the two inscriptions are identical; Ahura Mazda receives praise, and lineages and conquests are listed. According to Stuart C. Brown, in the pre-Hellenistic period, this mountain was apparently the main "east-west pass" through Mount Alvand. During the Achaemenid period, Ecbatana functioned as summer capital due to its high elevation and pleasant weather.

The site received its name from local natives, who believed that the inscriptions contained the secret code to a hidden treasure. Two modern contemporary carved tablets have been placed in the site's parking lot with Persian explanation and its English translation.

Gallery

Notes

References

Sources
 
 

Achaemenid inscriptions
Archaeology of the Achaemenid Empire
Tourist attractions in Hamadan Province
Darius the Great
Xerxes I
Akkadian inscriptions
Elamite language
Cuneiform
Persian words and phrases